Ricardo Sanz is a Spanish film producer. He began working as the manager of Carlos Aguilar father's production company. He owned Astro CC in which he produced along Lea Films Una bala marcada (1972), Tu fosa será la exacta... amigo (1972) and El hombre que mató a Billy el Niño (1966), all directed by Juan Bosch. He also produced I quattro inesorabili (1965), directed by Primo Zeglio.

Filmography

References

Bibliography

External links
 

Date of birth missing (living people)
Spanish film producers
Living people
Year of birth missing (living people)